STAPLE! The Independent Media Expo is an annual convention in Austin, Texas, United States, for alternative comics, minicomics, webcomics, zines, underground comics, and graphic arts. Chris Nicholas founded the conference as a gathering place for professional artists and amateur creators, "a showcase for the folks who publish comics and zines and possible literary masterworks out of their own apartments."

The show is sponsored by Austin Books, an Eisner-nominated comic book store and the site of the largest gathering of artists for the worldwide 24-Hour Comics Day held in 2005.

Additional sponsors include Rogues Gallery: Comics + Games, ECPrinting.com, Dragon's Lair: Comics & Fantasy, KOOP (FM), Motorblade Postering Services, CKP communication agency of record, and Bumperactive.com.

History 
Guests at the 2005 convention included Shannon Wheeler, Scott Kurtz, Terry Moore, and Michael Lark. Guests at the 2006 convention include Tony Millionaire, Jim Mahfood, Dave Crosland, David Hopkins, and winners of the Xeric Foundation grant for comic book self-publishers.

Guests at the 2007 convention include Dean Haspiel, Brian Keene, and Danielle Corsetto. Returning guests included Jim Mahfood, Dave Crosland, and David Hopkins. 2007 also marked the first Independent Animation Panel at STAPLE!

In 2011, the show expanded to two days. Guests included Jill Thompson, Alex Robinson, Brian Clevinger, Scott Wegener, and James O'Barr. Special guests of the 2012 show were Kevin Eastman, Jason Neulander, Brian Hurtt, Cullen Bunn, Monica Gallagher, Liz Prince, Kagan McLeod, and MariNaomi.

2013 guests included James O'Barr, Steve Niles, and Bernie Wrightson. Shannon Wheeler, Francesco Francavilla, Chip Zdarsky, Rob Harrell, and Paul Benjamin appeared at the show in 2014.

In 2015 the show featured a primarily female line-up of comics guests: Babs Tarr, Jess Fink, Kate Leth, Brooke Allen, and Grace Ellis; and two panels were conducted by Janelle Asselin.

The 2016 guest line-up included Benjamin Marra, Gene Ha, Emily Carrol, and Sophie Goldstein, and a Webcomics panel featured C. Spike Trotman, Danielle Corsetto, Dave Mercier, and Matt Melvin.

In 2017 the show moved to the Millennium Youth Entertainment Complex and was held in the second weekend of September. Hope Larson, Keith Knight, Ngozi Ukazu, Fabian Rangel Jr., Natasha Alterici, Jake Wyatt, Kyle Starks, and Kengo Hioki were among the featured guests.

The 2020 show, scheduled for October, was cancelled due to the COVID-19 pandemic.

Event dates and locations
 March 5, 2005: BPOE #201
 March 4, 2006: Red Oak Ballroom
 March 3, 2007: Red Oak Ballroom
 March 1, 2008: Monarch Event Center
 March 7, 2009: Monarch Event Center
 March 6, 2010: Monarch Event Center
 March 5–6, 2011: Marchesa Hall and Theatre
 March 3–4, 2012: Marchesa Hall and Theater
 March 2–3, 2013: Marchesa Hall and Theater
 March 1–2, 2014: Marchesa Hall and Theater
 March 7–8, 2015: Marchesa Hall and Theater
 March 5–6, 2016: Marchesa Hall and Theater
 September 9–10, 2017: Millennium Youth Entertainment Complex
 September 8–9, 2018: Millennium Youth Entertainment Complex
 October 12–13, 2019: Millennium Youth Entertainment Complex
 : Cancelled due to COVID-19 pandemic
 : Venue not reopened as of Aug 2021, and organizer busy

See also 
 Alternative Press Expo
 MoCCA Festival
 Small Press Expo

References

External links
 

Comics conventions in the United States
Recurring events established in 2005
Conventions in Texas